David Hall is an American former professional tennis player.

Hall, who comes from Massachusetts, played collegiate tennis for Duke University and was a three-time All-ACC.

Graduating from Duke in 1993, Hall went on to compete on the professional tour, reaching a best singles world ranking of 265. In 1994 he featured in the qualifying draws at both Wimbledon and the US Open. His only ATP Tour main draw appearance came in doubles at the 1995 Hall of Fame Tennis Championships, as a wildcard pairing with Louis Gloria.

References

External links 
 
 

Year of birth missing (living people)
Living people
American male tennis players
Duke Blue Devils men's tennis players
Tennis people from Massachusetts